The Tiger Fire was a wildfire that burned  in the U.S. state of Arizona from June to July 2021. The fire was caused by a dry lightning strike in the Prescott National Forest. Although Horsethief Basin Lake was evacuated and both the community of Crown King and the census-designated place of Black Canyon City were threatened, no injuries or deaths were reported, and no buildings were destroyed. Over 300 fire personnel were assigned to contain the blaze.

Events

Cause 
The fire began at around 2 pm (MDT) on June 30, 2021, in the Castle Creek Wilderness in the Prescott National Forest. The fire was caused by dry lightning from passing thunderstorms.

Wildfire 
Heavy smoke from the fire was visible along Interstate 17 near Sunset Point, Arizona. At this point, approximately 63 fire personnel were working to control the blaze, using equipment including two helicopters.

By 8:30 am on July 4, the completely-uncontained blaze had burned . A total of 159 personnel were working on easing the fire to keep it under control. Throughout the day, aerial firefighting was effective on the southern and eastern perimeters. An evacuation order was issued for Horsethief Basin Lake due to winds pushing the fire towards the reservoir, while Crown King was put on high alert. On the same day, scattered rain showers slowed the expansion of the fire and reduced its activity.

By July 7, the fire had burned  due to high temperatures and low humidity caused by a high-pressure system hovering over Arizona on July 6. A total of 323 personnel were working on containing the fire.

Aftermath 
The Tiger Fire burned  of dry grass and brush, with over 300 fire personnel responding to the blaze. The fire cost $5,644,000 (2021 USD) to suppress. A shelter was opened at New River Elementary School near Black Canyon Highway for evacuees affected by the blaze. No buildings were destroyed, and no injuries or deaths were reported for the duration of the fire.

Gallery

References 

2021 Arizona wildfires
Prescott National Forest